Raymond A. Langendries (born 1 October 1943 in Tubize) is a Belgian politician and Member of the European Parliament for the French Community of Belgium with the Centre Démocrate Humaniste, part of the European People's Party and sits on the European Parliament's Committee on Employment and Social Affairs.

He is a substitute for the Committee on Development, a member of the Delegation to the ACP-EU Joint Parliamentary Assembly and a substitute for the Delegation for relations with the People's Republic of China.

On 17 July 2008, he was one of three senior Belgian politicians commissioned by King Albert II to investigate ways of enabling constitutional reform talks in the light of the long-running Belgian constitutional crisis.

Education
 1964: Teaching diploma

Career
 1964-1972: Primary teacher
 1981-1985: Head of the office of the Minister for the Interior
 1972-1974: Secretary of the PSC in the House of Representatives
 1974-1979: PSC national secretary
 since 1971: Member of Tubize Municipal Council
 1976-1982: Deputy Mayor of Tubize
 since 1995: Mayor of Tubize
 1991-2004: Member of Parliament (1979–1981
 1979-1981 and 1991-1995: Chairman of the PSC Group in the House of Representatives
 1995-1999: President of the House of Representatives
 1999-2004: President of the cdH Group (PSC) in the House of Representatives
 1985-1991: Senator
 1985-1989: Chairman of the PSC Group in the Senate
 1989-1992: Minister for the Civil Service
 Belgian Member of the Inter-Parliamentary Union

Decorations
 Commander of the Order of Leopold (Belgium)
 Commander of the Order of the Crown
 2002: Minister of State

See also this
2004 European Parliament election in Belgium

References

External links
 
 

1943 births
Living people
Belgian Ministers of State
Centre démocrate humaniste MEPs
Commanders of the Order of the Crown (Belgium)
MEPs for Belgium 2004–2009
People from Tubize
Presidents of the Chamber of Representatives (Belgium)